Diego Ronquillo was the fifth Spanish governor of the Philippines, from March 10, 1583, until May 1584.  He was the brother (or nephew)  of his predecessor, Gonzalo Ronquillo de Peñalosa, and served as interim governor for little more than a year. Manila suffered heavy damage from a fire that occurred on March 19, 1583.

Captains General of the Philippines